Eel River Crossing is an unincorporated community in Restigouche County, New Brunswick, Canada. It held village status prior to 2023.

History

Its name usually being simplified to Eel River, the village is situated on the river of that name. The word "Crossing" was added to the name after the Intercolonial Railway built its Halifax-Rivière-du-Loup main line through the community in 1875. Since 1972, a high-voltage converter station, the Eel River Converter Station, is located in Eel River Crossing.

Eel River (Chaleur Bay) – A descriptive derived from the French designation Anguille. Anse a l'Anguille changed to Eel River Cove by petition on October 14, 1950.

In Mi'kmaq, Eel River was known as Okpĕgŭnchĭk which meant "discoloured foam on the water".

Following an amalgamation with surrounding areas in 2015, the village branded itself Eel River Dundee in 2018 but the legal name remained Eel River Crossing.

On 1 January 2023, Eel River Crossing amalgamated with the village of Balmoral and all or part of five local service districts to form the new village of Bois-Joli. The community's name remains in official use.

Demographics 

Population trend

 2011 population revised due to boundary changes.

Mother tongue (2016)

Notable people

See also
List of communities in New Brunswick

References

External links
 Eel River Crossing

Communities in Restigouche County, New Brunswick
Former villages in New Brunswick